Barry May (born 1 November 1944) is a South African-born former English cricketer who played first-class cricket for Oxford University in the early 1970s. He was born in Johannesburg and attended Prince Edward School in Salisbury, Rhodesia.

May's only first-class century was the 103 he hit against Glamorgan in June 1970.

With a degree in electronic engineering from the University of Cape Town, May first moved to the UK as a Rhodes Scholar and studied for a master's degree at Brasenose College, University of Oxford. During his time at Oxford he also won an Oxford blue for field hockey.

External links
 

1944 births
Living people
English cricketers
Oxford University cricketers
University of Cape Town alumni
Alumni of Brasenose College, Oxford